Blake Raymond Anderson (born March 2, 1984) is an American actor, comedian, producer, screenwriter, and fashion designer. Beginning in 2006, Anderson helped create and join the sketch-comedy troupe Mail Order Comedy, which produced online videos and sketches, such as those involving the rap band The Wizards, along with co-members Anders Holm, Adam DeVine, and Kyle Newacheck. In 2011, Anderson, along with Holm, DeVine, and Newacheck, began starring as fictional versions of themselves in the Comedy Central comedy television series Workaholics, which Anderson co-created. Workaholics ran on the network from 2011 until 2017, airing seven seasons in total. Anderson has appeared in other film and television works, often with other members of Mail Order Comedy.

In 2017, Anderson was nominated for two Behind the Voice Actors' People's Choice Voice Acting Awards for his work on Voltron: Legendary Defender, winning the nomination for Best Vocal Ensemble in a New Television Series. He was also nominated for a Young Hollywood Award in 2014.

Early life
Anderson was born in Concord, California, on March 2, 1984. He attended Clayton Valley High School in Concord, California. He later moved to Los Angeles to work with improvisational comedy troupes such as The Groundlings and Upright Citizens Brigade. While working as a pizza delivery driver, he attended Orange Coast College in Costa Mesa, where he met future co-star Adam DeVine.

Career
In 2006, Anderson formed the sketch comedy group Mail Order Comedy with Anders Holm, DeVine, and Kyle Newacheck and achieved YouTube notoriety. In 2011, he played Tad on the Fox show Traffic Light. Next, he had small cameos on HBO's Entourage and the Fox show House. He has gone on to appear in episodes of Community, Arrested Development, Parks and Recreation, The Big Bang Theory, The Simpsons, Brooklyn Nine-Nine, and Drunk History, among others. He has starred on the Comedy Central show Workaholics (2011-2017), and the Hulu series Woke (2020–2022).

He also tours the country to perform his stand-up comedy.

In 2013, he co-created the fashion line Teenage with his then-wife, Rachael Finley.

Personal life

On December 17, 2011, Anderson required surgery after jumping from his roof onto a beer pong table during a house party and fracturing his spine.

On September 7, 2012, Anderson married Rachael Finley. They have one daughter, born in 2014, and were divorced in 2017.

Filmography

Film

Television

References

External links
 Official website of Mail Order Comedy
 

1984 births
American male film actors
American male television actors
American male voice actors
American male comedians
Living people
Male actors from Sacramento, California
People from Concord, California
Orange Coast College alumni
American television writers
American male television writers
Television producers from California
21st-century American male actors
Comedians from California
Screenwriters from California
21st-century American comedians
21st-century American screenwriters
21st-century American male writers